The first USS McLanahan (DD-264) was a  in the United States Navy and transferred to the Royal Navy where she served as HMS Bradford (H72) during World War II.

Design
The Clemson-class was a modified version of the previous  (itself a faster version of the ) with more fuel, as many of the Wickes-class had poor fuel economy and hence endurance. Like the Wickes-class ships, the Clemsonss had flush-decks and four funnels and were ordered in very large numbers to meet the US Navy's need for ships to counter German U-boats as well as to operate with the fleet.

Displacement was  normal and  full load. McLanahan had four Yarrow boilers that fed two sets of Curtis geared steam turbines.

Main gun armament consisted of four  /50 caliber guns, with one forward and one aft on the ship's centerline, and the remaining two on the ships beam. Anti-aircraft armament consisted of two 3"/23 caliber guns, while torpedo armament consisted of twelve 21 inch (533 mm) torpedo tubes, arranged in four triple mounts on the ship's beams.

As USS McLanahan

Named for Tenant McLanahan, McLanahan was laid down on 20 April 1918 by the Bethlehem Shipbuilding Corporation's Victory Destroyer Plant in Squantum, Quincy, Massachusetts. The ship was launched on 22 September 1918; sponsored by Mrs. Charles M. Howe. The destroyer was accepted and commissioned on 5 April 1919.

After shakedown off the Massachusetts coast, and a cruise in European waters, McLanahan was assigned to the Pacific Fleet in October 1919, being based at San Diego, California. She was placed in reserve and decommissioned in June 1922. She remained at San Diego until recommissioning 18 December 1939. Then, following overhaul and fitting out, she steamed to the east coast. On 8 October 1940 she decommissioned as a U.S. Navy ship at Halifax, Nova Scotia, and commissioned in the Royal Navy, under the terms of the Destroyers for Bases Agreement, as Bradford (H72).

As HMS Bradford

HMS Bradford was modified for long range trade convoy escort service by removal of the two forward boilers and substitution of additional fuel tanks. This modification improved endurance but reduced top speed to 25 knots.  Bradford performed escort duties in the Atlantic, including convoys to North Africa, for Operation Torch, from 1941 to 1943. On 3 May 1943 she was declared no longer fit for ocean escort work and was ordered decommissioned at Devonport. There, for the remainder of the war, she served as an accommodation ship. She was scrapped at Troon 19 June 1946.

Notes

References

External links
http://www.navsource.org/archives/05/264.htm

 

Clemson-class destroyers
Ships built in Quincy, Massachusetts
1918 ships
Ships transferred from the United States Navy to the Royal Navy
Town-class destroyers of the Royal Navy
Town-class destroyers converted from Clemson-class destroyers
World War II destroyers of the United Kingdom